Dark Horse is a 2005 Danish-Icelandic film directed by Dagur Kári, about a young man, his best friend, and a girl. It was screened in the Un Certain Regard section at the 2005 Cannes Film Festival.

Cast and characters
 Jakob Cedergren as Daniel
 Nicolas Bro as Morfar
 Tilly Scott Pedersen as Franc
 Morten Suurballe as Dommeren
 Angela Bundalovic as Dommeren's daughter
 Bodil Jørgensen as Gunvor
 Nicolaj Kopernikus as Tejs
 Anders Hove as Herluf C
 Kristian Halken as Allan Simonsen
 Thomas W. Gabrielsson as Sleep researcher Arne
 Michelle Bjørn-Andersen as Dommerens' wife
 Pauli Ryberg as Skule Malmquist
 Mikael Bertelsen as clerk
 Asta Esper Hagen Andersen as grandmother Lovisa
 Vera Gebuhr as lady in bakery
 Peder Pedersen as graffiti artist

References

External links
 

2005 films
2000s Danish-language films
2005 romantic comedy films
Films directed by Dagur Kári
Danish romantic comedy films
Nimbus Film films
Films shot in Almería
Icelandic romantic comedy films